Proclus or Proklos is the name of several historical figures.

By itself, the name Proclus normally refers to:

 Proclus Diadochus (Proklos the Successor), the 5th century Neoplatonist philosopher

Proclus may also refer to:

In history and literary history:

Archbishop Proclus of Constantinople, a 5th-century saint
Eutychius Proclus, a 2nd-century grammarian, tutor of Marcus Aurelius, and sometimes identified with the author of the Chrestomathy (below)
Proclus, the author of the Chrestomathy, a lost summary of the ancient Greek Epic Cycle, a collection of epic poems related to the Trojan War, sometimes identified with Proclus Diadochus or  Eutychius Proclus (above)
Proclus (prefect of Constantinople), who lived under the reign of Theodosius the Great in the 4th century
Proclus Oneirocrites, a soothsayer
Proclus Mallotes, a Stoic philosopher
Proclus of Laodicea or Proculeius, a priest at Laodicea in Syria, and author of philosophical works
Proclus of Naucratis, a 2nd-century teacher of rhetoric
Proclus (mosaicist), an artist in the time of Augustus
Larginus Proclus, a 1st-century German who narrowly escaped execution by Domitian

In astronomy:
Proclus (crater), a crater on the moon

The following are correctly called Proculus:

several Christian saints named Proculus: see Saint Proculus (disambiguation)
Proculus, the 3rd-century Roman usurper
Proculus Julius, a person in the legendary history of the Roman Kingdom

Ancient sources are known to have called the following both Proclus, Proculus, and other variants:

Proclus (Montanist) or Proculus, a 2nd-century adherent of Montanism and founder of the sect called the Procliani
Proclus of Rhegium or Proculus, a 1st-century physician

Human name disambiguation pages